A simple squamous epithelium, also known as pavement epithelium, and tessellated epithelium is a single layer of flattened, polygonal cells in contact with the basal lamina (one of the two layers of the basement membrane) of the epithelium. This type of epithelium is often permeable and occurs where small molecules need to pass quickly through membranes via filtration or diffusion. Simple squamous epithelia are found in endothelium (lining of blood and lymph capillaries), mesothelium (coelomic epithelium/peritoneum), alveoli of lungs, glomeruli, and other tissues where rapid diffusion is required. Within the cardiovascular system such as lining capillaries or the inside of the heart, simple squamous epithelium is specifically called the endothelium. Cells are flat with flattened and oblong nuclei. It is also called pavement epithelium due to its tile-like appearance. This epithelium is associated with filtration and diffusion. This tissue is extremely thin, and forms a delicate lining. It offers very little protection.

Simple squamous epithelium falls under the physiological category of exchange epithelium due to its ability to rapidly transport molecules across the tissue layer. To facilitate this movement, some types of simple squamous epithelium may have pores between cells to allow molecules to move through it, creating a leaky epithelium.

References

Epithelial cells